Gideon (Gidi) Eilat (1924–2015) was a former member of the Palmach, commander of the third battalion of the Yiftach Brigade during the 1947–1949 Palestine war. Active in the Kibbutz Artzi movement, one of the founders of the Civil Guard of the Israel Police Department, and a member of Kibbutz Beit Alfa.

Childhood
Eilat, originally “Lewald”, was born in 1924 in the city of Königsberg in East Prussia (known today as Kaliningrad under Russian sovereignty).
His mother Rivkah (Betty) was brought up in the Karlin-Hassidic dynastic tradition. She was in her profession a medical Doctor. His father Kurt (Tobi) was a Doctor of Jurisprudence. During his childhood, Gidi studied at the public school in the city of Königsberg. He became a member of the “Habbonim Dror” (builders of freedom) society. In 1933 Gidi emigrated with his family to Mandatory Palestine.

His parents settled in Tel Aviv, but he was sent to study in the educational institute of the HaShomer HaTzair located in kibbutz Mishmar HaEmek. Gidi studied there for two years and that was his first encounter with the HaShomer HaTzair movement, and the Kibbutz Artzi. During Junior High School he attended a worker's children school (Beit Hinuch L’ ieladei ovdim) in Tel Aviv. After finishing he signed up in Tichon Hadash, there he became the first student enrolled in the school.
During his teen years, he joined a branch of the HaShomer HaTzair in Tel Aviv. Together with his classmates he became part of a group known as Gdud HaSade whose mission was to join kibbutz Beit Alfa. While a junior in High School, he interrupted his studies for one year, to be the organizer of all senior students throughout Israel who joined the defense forces then being set up.

Palmach, War of Independence and the IDF
In 1942 Gidi enlisted in the Palmach and served as a member of the 5th company stationed in Kibbutz Na’an. Upon completion of his basic training he was assigned to a Squad Commanders Training School (MAKIM) in kibbutz Kfar Menachem.
Once having completed the MAKIM training he joined a Commander of Heavy Artillery course and became squad leader of the 5th company in Givat Haim.

In 1945 he took part in a training class for Platoon Commander of the Haganah in Jo'ara, under the command of Yigal Yadin. After completion he was assigned as Communications Officer in the 2nd battalion. During this stint, he served as Haim Bar-Lev's assistant in the action to destroy the Allenby Bridge, as part of the “Night of the Bridges” operation. A few days later he was arrested by the British as part of the “Black Shabbat” sweeps of underground fighters. He was held in the British military prison in Latrun, together with many other leaders of the “Yishuv” and other fighters.

Towards the end of 1946 he was promoted to be commander of the 2nd company in the 2nd battalion. He served for over a year in this capacity, In 1947 he was released from the Palmach and officially became a member of kibbutz Beit Alfa.

At the start of the war of independence, he still worked in the kibbutz, until he was drafted in January to become a teacher in a Platoon Commanders Course, which was the last of the Haganah and a first for the IDF. The course was organized under the tutelage of Haim Laskov in Machaneh Dora in Netanya. All the commanders involved in this course created afterwards the 7th brigade at the time that Israel declared its independence.
Eilat became commander of the 4th company in the 72nd battalion of the 7th brigade.
He led the company in the bloody Battle of Latrun. After serving in the 7th brigade he returned to the Training Section for a short time. From there he went back to the Palmach as assistant to the commander of the battalion in the Yiftach brigade.

After a short time he was promoted to commander of the battalion replacing Moshe Kelman and led the battalion during Operation Yoav in the western Negev. The battalion's mission was to cut off the Egyptian forces in the Beit Hanoun area. In conjunction with all the other IDF forces in the area, it brought the liberation of the northern Negev and the capture of over twenty towns and villages, including Beersheva.

At the end of the war he joined the Operations Planning Department of the Chiefs of Staff. There he served under the supervision of Israel Bar. After finishing a Battalion Commanders Course successfully he was dismissed from the IDF with the rank of “Sgan Aluf”. During his reserve service he was battalion commander in the Carmeli Brigade as well as other duties in the Northern Command(Pikud HaTzafon)

Other Functions
During the 1950s, Eilat was active in the Security Section of the Kibbutz Artzi. First as an assistant to Shimon Avidan and later as head of section. During the years 1966-1970 he returned to his second tour of duty for the movement of the Kibbutz Artzi in the Personnel Department. During the first stage of his service he was director of the seminars offered by the movement in Givat Haviva. Following this he was head of the Personnel department.

In 1974 he was one of the founders of the Civil Guard ( HaMishmar HaEzrahi) in the police department, together with his friend Mulla Cohen. Until 1977 he was commander of the Northern Sector in this body, with the rank of “Nitzav Mishneh” (Chief Superintendent).
Afterwards he moved to the “MishmarHaGvul” (Border Guard), where he performed as commander of the “Yeshuvim Artzi” (Border Towns).

Through the years he filled different functions in his kibbutz. He was twice Secretary of the kibbutz, he served as manager of the KAV-KOR thermostat manufacturing facility in Beit Alfa. He also served as Treasurer in the Gilboa High School and was head of Human Resources for the industries of the Regional Council of the Beit Shean Valley. In addition he managed the efforts to connect the adjacent kibbutzim with the surrounding Beit Shean area.

After retirement he began research into the history of the years just prior and after the foundation of the country in connection with the security aspect. In 2000 he wrote a few articles in a book titled “Lo Iochlu Biladeinu” on MAPAM and its function in the realm of foreign affairs and security.

In the last two decades he was active in “Yad Ya’ari”, an archive of the HaShomer HaTzair and also in the Galilee Center in Yad Tabenkin which is the “Think Tank” of Kibbutz HaMeuhad movement. Through the years he was a member of the committee to award the “Yitzhak Sadeh” and the “Yigal Alon” prizes.

Family
Eilat was married to Ruti and had four children. Revital, Einat, Iftach and Harel as well as grandchildren and great grandchildren.

Further reading
Ram Oren, Latrun, Keshet 2002.
Ram Oren, HaMatarah: Tel Aviv (The Target: Tel Aviv), Keshet, 2004.
Eli Tzur, Lo Iochlu Biladeinu, (Views of MAPAM members on the questions of Foreign Affairs and Security) 1948–1956, Yad Tabankin, 2000.
Shlomo Shamir, B’KolMechir L’Yerushalaim-HaMarachah B’Latrun Ha’Chrah B’Derech 7, Marachot, 1994 (At Any Price Jerusalem -the Battle of Latrun ), Marachot, 1994
Meir Pail and Abraham Zohar, Palmach: Plugot HaMachatz B’Haganah V’tzahal 1941-1949, MisradHaBitachon, 2008(Palmach: Strike Force of the Haganah and the IDF 1941–1949), Defense Department, 2008.

References

External links
jewishvirtuallibrary.org

1924 births
2015 deaths
Jewish emigrants from Nazi Germany to Mandatory Palestine
Israeli police officers
Kibbutzniks
Palmach members
People from East Prussia